M protein is a virulence factor that can be produced by certain species of Streptococcus.

Viruses, parasites and bacteria are covered in protein and sugar molecules that help them gain entry into a host by counteracting the host's defenses. One such molecule is the M protein produced by certain streptococcal bacteria. At its C-terminus within the cell wall, M proteins embody a motif that is now known to be shared by many Gram-positive bacterial surface proteins. The motif includes a conserved hexapeptide LPXTGE, which precedes a hydrophobic C-terminal membrane spanning domain, which itself precedes a cluster of basic residues at the C-terminus.

M protein is strongly anti-phagocytic and is the major virulence factor for group A streptococci (Streptococcus pyogenes). It binds to serum factor H, destroying C3-convertase and preventing opsonization by C3b. However plasma B cells can generate antibodies against M protein which will help in opsonization and further the destruction of the microorganism by the macrophages and neutrophils. Cross-reactivity of anti-M protein antibodies with heart muscle has been suggested to be associated in some way with rheumatic fever.

It was originally identified by Rebecca Lancefield, who also formulated the Lancefield classification system  for streptococcal bacteria. Bacteria like S. pyogenes, which possess M protein are classified in group A of the Lancefield system.

Literature

References

Virulence factors
Streptococcal proteins